Hylaeaicum myrmecophilum is a species of flowering plant in the family Bromeliaceae, native to northern Brazil, Colombia, Ecuador and Venezuela. It was first described by Ernst Heinrich Georg Ule in 1905.

References

Bromelioideae
Flora of Brazil
Flora of Colombia
Flora of Ecuador
Flora of Venezuela
Plants described in 1905